Penicuik Rugby Club is a rugby football club in the Scottish Rugby Union, playing their home games at Public Park, Penicuik, Midlothian. Season 2015–16 saw the club become league champions of East Regional League Division Two, under the coaching duo of Mark Blair and Malcolm Clapperton. In season 2015-16 the Second XV under the coaching guidance of Richard Mann also gained promotion, to East Reserve league 2 having been runners up to Currie RFC on points.

The senior teams train on a Tuesday and Thursday evening at 7.00pm under the coaching guidance of Blair, Mann and Kretzel. During the Autumn test period and on Six Nations weekends the club welcomes touring sides to their clubhouse.

The club have had a number of representative caps most notable amongst those is Jim Aitken, who captained the Scotland team to a Grand Slam victory in the 1984 Five Nations tournament. More recently Sarah Law represented Scotland Women both at Sevens and Fifteens and her younger sister, Rachel Law gained an under-20 cap in a game against Belgium Women.

Sevens tournament

The club run the Penicuik Sevens tournament. Teams play for the President's Cup. Penicuik are the current holders (2022).

Honours

Penicuik Sevens
Champions: 1980, 1987, 1989, 1991, 2022
Livingston Sevens
Champions: 1972
Lanark Sevens
Champions: 1971
Old Aloysians Sevens
Champions: 1977

References

External links 
Official Penicuik RFC website

Rugby union in Midlothian
Scottish rugby union teams
Penicuik